Simona Kegel is a paralympic athlete from Germany competing mainly in category F37  events.

In the 1996 Summer Paralympics Kegel competed in the 100m, 200m and long jump. It wasn't until she changed to the shot put in the 2000 Summer Paralympics that she won a medal, silver, in the F37 class.

References

Paralympic athletes of Germany
Athletes (track and field) at the 1996 Summer Paralympics
Athletes (track and field) at the 2000 Summer Paralympics
Paralympic silver medalists for Germany
Living people
Medalists at the 2000 Summer Paralympics
Year of birth missing (living people)
Paralympic medalists in athletics (track and field)
German female sprinters
German female long jumpers
German female shot putters